Serpico is an American crime drama series that aired on NBC from September 24, 1976, until January 28, 1977. The series was based on the book by Peter Maas and the 1973 film of the same name that starred Al Pacino in the title role. A television movie, Serpico: The Deadly Game, served as pilot and aired in April 1976.

Summary
David Birney stars as the unorthodox NYPD detective Frank Serpico who battles corrupt members of the police force. Tom Atkins co-stars as Lieutenant Tom Sullivan. The series aired 14 episodes before being canceled in January 1977 and replaced with Quincy, M.E.

Cast
David Birney as Frank Serpico
Tom Atkins as Lt. Tom Sullivan

Production notes
Iranian director Reza Badiyi served as one of several directors of the series. Serpico'''s theme song was written by Elmer Bernstein.

Episodes

References

External links
 
 

1976 American television series debuts
1977 American television series endings
1970s American crime drama television series
English-language television shows
NBC original programming
Live action television shows based on films
Television series by CBS Studios
Television shows set in New York City